"Bitch from da Souf" is the debut single by American rapper Latto (then known as "Mulatto"), released in January 2019. Produced by Bankroll Got It, it is the lead single from her second EP Big Latto (2019). The song is considered Latto's breakout hit; its success led to her signing to RCA Records. On December 4, 2019, a remix of the song was released, featuring fellow female rappers Saweetie and Trina, as the lead single from Latto's debut studio album Queen of Da Souf (2020).

Composition
The Fader has described the song has an "anthem for women from below the Mason-Dixon line." With sex references, Latto calls herself a "real ass, rich ass bitch from the Souf".

Music video
The music video of the song was released on January 11, 2019, and the music video for the remix was released on March 24, 2020.

Charts

Certifications

References

2019 debut singles
2019 songs
Latto songs
RCA Records singles
Saweetie songs
Trina songs
Songs written by Saweetie
Songs written by Trina
Songs written by Latto